Naira Beatriz Vier (born 12 July 1996) is a Brazilian female badminton player.

Career
Her partner is Bianca de Oliveira Lima. Both of them were defeated in the final round by the German pair Barbara Bellenberg and Eva Janssens at the 2016 Brazil Open Grand Prix.

Achievements

BWF Grand Prix 
The BWF Grand Prix has two level such as Grand Prix and Grand Prix Gold. It is a series of badminton tournaments, sanctioned by Badminton World Federation (BWF) since 2007.

Women's Doubles

 BWF Grand Prix Gold tournament
 BWF Grand Prix tournament

References

External links 
 tournamentsoftware.com

Living people
1996 births
Brazilian female badminton players
21st-century Brazilian women